Andersonia caerulea, commonly known as foxtails, is a species of flowering plant in the family Ericaceae and is endemic to the southwest of Western Australia. It is an erect or spreading to low-lying shrub with variably-shaped leaves and pink and pale blue flowers, sometimes in spike-like groups.

Description
Taller, erect plants have the flowers arranged in a compact spike, but low-lying plants have the flowers arranged otherwise. The leaves are variable in shape and size, egg-shaped to lance-shaped or linear, sometimes twisted or wavy, sometimes with a pointed tip, variably hairy or glabrous. The sepals are lance-shaped, pink, lilac or pale blue and the petals are shorter than the sepals, usually pale blue and densely bearded inside the petal tube.

Taxonomy
Andersonia caerulea was first formally described by Robert Brown in his Prodromus Florae Novae Hollandiae from specimens he collected at King George Sound in 1801. The specific epithet (caerulea) means "deep sky-blue".

Distribution and habitat
Foxtails grows in sandy soil and is widespread in the south-west of Western Australia, occurring in the Avon Wheatbelt, Esperance Plains, Jarrah Forest, Mallee, Swan Coastal Plain and Warren bioregions.

References

Ericales
caerulea
Endemic flora of Western Australia
Plants described in 1810
Taxa named by Robert Brown (botanist, born 1773)